Archduchess Marie of Austria may refer to:

 Archduchess Elisabeth Marie of Austria (1883–1963), only child of Crown Prince Rudolf of Austria and Princess Stéphanie
 Archduchess Marie Amalie of Austria (1746-1804), Princess of Hungary
 Archduchess Marie Astrid of Austria (born 1954), Princess Royal of Hungary and Bohemia
 Archduchess Marie Caroline of Austria (1801–1832), Crown Princess of Saxony
 Archduchess Marie Caroline of Austria (1794-1795), daughter of Francis II, Holy Roman Emperor and Maria Teresa of the Two Sicilies
 Archduchess Marie Valerie of Austria (1868–1924), fourth and last child of Franz Josef, Emperor of Austria-Hungary and Elisabeth, Duchess in Bavaria

See also

 Archduchess Maria (disambiguation)
 Duchess Marie (disambiguation)
 Grand Duchess Maria (disambiguation)